The Jacob Wirth Restaurant was a historic German-American restaurant and bar in Boston, Massachusetts at 31-39 Stuart Street. Founded in 1868, Jacob Wirth was the second oldest continuously operated restaurant in Boston when it closed in 2018.

The Greek Revival building housing the restaurant was constructed in 1844. The German style restaurant was founded in 1868 and was the second oldest continuously operating restaurant in the city after the Union Oyster House. The restaurant was added to the National Register of Historic Places in 1980 and designated a Boston Landmark in 1977, with interior and exterior protections. Jacob Wirth was the first distributor of Anheuser Busch products.  The Wirth family and Anheuser family are from the same small town in Germany.

In 2010, Chelsea developer AJ Simboli Real Estate purchased the property for $1.6 million.  The restaurant was put up for sale in January 2018 after having filed for Chapter 11 bankruptcy, and closed following a fire in June of that year. As recently as October 2021 there was a restoration effort under way to repair fire damage and reopen the restaurant as it had been prior to its closure.

In March 2022, Julia Sokol (identified as a manager for the Greater Boston Bar Co.), could reopen by the end of 2022.

Popular culture
The Tom Cruise and Cameron Diaz movie Knight and Day filmed a wedding scene here.

Jacob Wirth Restaurant was referenced during a meeting in Andrew Dominik's Killing Them Softly.

See also
National Register of Historic Places listings in northern Boston, Massachusetts
The Student Prince (restaurant), historical German restaurant in Springfield, Massachusetts

References

External links

City of Boston Boston Landmarks CommissionJacob Wirth Building Study Report

Drinking establishments on the National Register of Historic Places in Massachusetts
Restaurants on the National Register of Historic Places in Massachusetts
Defunct restaurants in Boston
German restaurants in the United States
German-American culture in Massachusetts
1868 establishments in Massachusetts
2018 disestablishments in Massachusetts
Cultural history of Boston
Drinking establishments in Boston
Boston Theater District
Restaurants established in 1868
Restaurants disestablished in 2018
National Register of Historic Places in Boston
Landmarks in Chinatown, Boston
Buildings and structures completed in 1844
Companies that filed for Chapter 11 bankruptcy in 2018